"She Don't Tell Me To" is a song written by Tom Shapiro, Bob DiPiero and Rivers Rutherford, and recorded by American country music duo Montgomery Gentry. It was released in October 2005 as the only single from their compilation album titled Something to Be Proud Of: The Best of 1999-2005.

Content
In this slow-tempoed tune, the narrator describes things he does for his lover (e.g., bringing home wildflowers, going to church with her after leaving early from Saturday nights out with his buddies, and apologizing when he is wrong in an argument) out of his own choice, rather than because she tells him to do so.

Music video
The music video was directed by Deb Haus and Jerad Sloan. It peaked at #5 on CMT's Top 20 Countdown in March 2006. It was shot over 2 days, in Iceland.

Chart positions

Year-end charts

References

2005 singles
2005 songs
Montgomery Gentry songs
Songs written by Tom Shapiro
Songs written by Bob DiPiero
Songs written by Rivers Rutherford
Columbia Records singles
Song recordings produced by Mark Wright (record producer)